The Protestantism in Besançon is a schism of the Catholic Church in the French city of Besançon, Franche-Comté. Like the rest of the country, the lutheranism ideas are diffused in the city and his region in the 1520s, and mainly from 1538 when Guillaume Farel preached in an old house of the center. The location of Besançon facilitated the reform, the area is between Montbéliard and the Swiss, two Protestant "strongholds". Civil and religious authorities decided to fight it. All Protestants, called "Huguenots" or "heretics", was oppressed, imprisoned, tortured, and sometimes murdered or sentenced to death. This situation lasted until 1575, however reformed tried to resist few times, until the final battle where they are smashed. During two centuries, to French Revolution, Protestants or supporters are deleted. But at the beginning of the 19th century, they return free to the city, and created their church, the holy spirit temple. In 1999, 2000 believers are in the Besançon's paroisse.

History

The Reformation

The Battle of 1575

The community today

Buildings

Holy spirit temple

Champs-Bruley cemetery

Other protestants

Pentecote of Besançon

Cépée church 

 
History of Protestantism in France